General Money may refer to:

Arthur Wigram Money (1866–1951), British Army major general
Ernest Money (1866–1952), British Indian Army brigadier general
John Money (aeronaut) (1752–1817), British Army general
Noel Money (1867–1941), British Army brigadier general
Robert Cotton Money (1888–1985), British Army major general